Tyson Marcus Miller (born July 29, 1995) is an American professional baseball pitcher for the Milwaukee Brewers of Major League Baseball (MLB). He has previously played in MLB for the Chicago Cubs and Texas Rangers.

Career
Miller attended Shadow Hills High School in Indio, California. In 2013, as a senior, he went 6-0 with a 0.19 ERA. He was not drafted in the 2013 MLB draft, thus enrolling at California Baptist University where he played college baseball. In 2014, his freshman year, he appeared in 13 games (ten starts), going 7-1 with a 2.63 ERA, and in 2015, as a sophomore, he went 7-3 with a 3.32 ERA in 14 games (13 starts), earning a spot on the Pacific West Conference Second Team. After the 2015 season, he played collegiate summer baseball with the Brewster Whitecaps of the Cape Cod Baseball League. As a junior in 2017, Miller pitched to a 9-3 record with a 2.27 ERA in 16 games (15 starts). He was named to the PacWest First Team.

Chicago Cubs
After the season, he was drafted by the Chicago Cubs in the fourth round of the 2016 MLB draft.

Miller signed with Chicago and spent his first professional season with the Arizona League Cubs and Eugene Emeralds, going 2-1 with a 3.14 ERA in  innings.

In 2017, Miller spent the season with the South Bend Cubs, pitching to a 6-7 record and a 4.48 ERA in 28 games (twenty starts), and 2018 with the Myrtle Beach Pelicans, going 9-9 with a 3.54 ERA in 23 starts.

In 2019, Miller started the season with the Tennessee Smokies and was promoted to the Iowa Cubs in July. Over 26 starts between both teams, Miller went 7-8 with a 4.35 ERA, striking out 123 over  innings. Following the season, he was added to Chicago's 40–man roster.

On August 17, 2020, Miller was promoted to the major leagues, and made his MLB debut that day against the St. Louis Cardinals, pitching two innings and giving up two runs. He finished his rookie season with a 5.40 ERA in 2 games.

Miller was assigned to the Triple-A Iowa Cubs to begin the 2021 season. He struggled to a 5.06 ERA before being designated for assignment on May 30, 2021.

Texas Rangers
On June 4, 2021, Miller was claimed off waivers by the Texas Rangers. He was assigned to the Triple-A Round Rock Express, and made one appearance for the team, allowing 2 runs in 3.0 innings of work. On June 18, Miller was designated for assignment without appearing in a game for Texas. He was outrighted on June 20.

On June 10, 2022, Texas selected Miller's contract as a COVID replacement player. He had his contract selected on September 11, 2022.

Milwaukee Brewers
On November 11, 2022, Miller was claimed off waivers by the Milwaukee Brewers.

References

External links

1995 births
Living people
African-American baseball players
Arizona League Cubs players
Baseball players from California
Brewster Whitecaps players
California Baptist Lancers baseball players
Chicago Cubs players
Eugene Emeralds players
Iowa Cubs players
Major League Baseball pitchers
Myrtle Beach Pelicans players
People from Fairfield, California
Round Rock Express players
South Bend Cubs players
Tennessee Smokies players
Texas Rangers players
21st-century African-American sportspeople